Chaminade-Madonna College Preparatory (CMCP) is a private Marianist school located in Hollywood, Florida, United States, on Chaminade Drive, in front of Nativity Catholic School in the Roman Catholic Archdiocese of Miami. Covering high school and college preparatory curricula, it runs from 9th grade to 12th grade. The school has been accredited by the Southern Association of Colleges and Schools since 1921 and is a Blue Ribbon School of Excellence.

History

1960-1988 
In response to the growing population and the need for quality schools, the Archdiocese of Miami invited the Marianists and the School Sisters of Notre Dame to establish a school for boys, Chaminade High School, and a school for girls, Madonna Academy. Under the direction of Bro. Joseph Spehar, S.M., and Sister Eugene Marie, SSND, Chaminade High School and Madonna Academy opened their doors to the South Broward and North Miami-Dade communities in 1960. 

In 1963, Bro. Donald Gaskill, S.M. was appointed principal of Chaminade High School to continue to establish the Marianist traditions of education, as well as reach out to the local communities. He would remain until 1969, with the appointment of Bro. Michael Galvin, S.M.. He was primarily responsible for obtaining accreditation from the Southern Association of Colleges and Schools. Chaminade High School was accredited for the first time in 1973. In 1973,  Fr. Richard Knuge, S.M. was appointed principal. Under his administration, construction of a school chapel and library was completed. The school's fifth principal, Bro. Donald Winfree, S.M., supervised the construction of the Strickroth Classroom building, named in honor of Bro. John Strickroth, S.M. 

In 1982, Fr. Chris Conlon, S.M., was appointed principal. This same year, Bro. John Campbell, S.M., was appointed the school's first President. His primary responsibility was the financial and spiritual well-being of the school. By the mid-80s parts of the movie Superfantagenio where filme at the gym of the Chaminade Lions.

In 1986, Bro. Raymond Purcell, S.M., succeeded Fr. Conlon as the leader of the school. Facing declining enrollment and financial difficulties, in 1988, the Archdiocese of Miami, the Superior General of the Marianists and the School Sisters of Notre Dame agreed to merge Chaminade High School and Madonna Academy.

1988-present 
In August 1988, Chaminade-Madonna College Preparatory was established as a coed high school. Longtime Chaminade High School teacher, counselor, and administrator, Robert Minnaugh, was named principal and charged with forming a new vision. Fr. Dan Doyle, S.M., was named the first president of the new school. Fr. Richard Knuge, S.M. succeeded Fr. Doyle in 1992. In that year, Chaminade-Madonna was honored by the Department of Education with the Blue Ribbon School of Excellence Award. Four years later, Bro. John Campbell, S.M. was appointed president. During his tenure as president, he worked diligently with Mr. Minnaugh to complete construction of the Einstein Building and the renovation of Marianist Hall (which contains the department chair offices).

In 1998, Robert Minnaugh announced his retirement. Longtime assistant principal Ann McGrath was named the interim principal through the 1997/1998 school year. Under some criticism, Patrick Snay was appointed principal in the summer of 1999. Under his leadership, the school's focus turned to the development of a sports program. This included the construction of a multimillion-dollar sports complex, increased scholarship availability and other improvements that led to an award-winning program. In addition, the Learning Center was established to help students suffering from learning disabilities.

In 2002, Fr. John Thompson, S.M., was appointed president of the school. His initial focus was the construction of the athletic fields. The newly renovated athletic complex was completed in December 2004. He led the school through its first Capital Campaign, highlighted by the construction of a new Fine Arts Center, a project that had initially been proposed in 1998.

In July 2003, the first Hispanic principal of the school, and first woman, Gloria Ramos, was appointed.

In the fall of 2007, the house system was implemented. This complements the formal system of classroom education by organizing students into small groups to develop leadership skills and foster the Marianist commitment to community.

On May 15, 2007, Mark Guandolo resigned as the athletic director and head football coach one year after his son graduated from C-M; he took the head coaching job at Cypress Bay High School. Guandolo had success as the football coach with a record of 81-13 and two state championships over seven years.

In July 2008, Father Larry Doersching, S.M., was appointed president.

The 2009–2010 school year marked Chaminade-Madonna's 50th anniversary.  It began in August 2009 with a cake cutting ceremony, and an aerial photograph of students, faculty, and staff forming a "50."  C-M traditions and events throughout the school year continued to commemorate the rich history of Chaminade High School, Madonna Academy, and Chaminade-Madonna College Preparatory over the previous 50 years.

In October 2010, Chaminade-Madonna was voted the "Best School in Hollywood second to South Broward High School" in the "Best of Hollywood" contest sponsored by the Hollywood Gazette.

In July 2011, Teresita Vazquez Wardlow (class of 1981) was appointed as the new principal.

In 2012–2013, Chaminade-Madonna announced its new educational technology initiative, which required all students to have iPads.

In 2015 a new president was announced.  Dr. Judith Mucheck was the first lay president of Chaminade-Madonna since its founding in 1960. All previous presidents were professed Brothers or Priests of the Society of Mary (Marianists). Dr. Mucheck brings a wealth of experience in Catholic school education, having served as a high school teacher, university professor, education consultant, principal, and president at several Catholic schools, as well as serving as Superintendent of Schools for the Archdiocese of Atlanta, Georgia. Her career in Catholic school education spans over thirty years.

About
The school currently offers remedial classes in numerous subjects, including both honors and AP courses to qualifying students. A unique "Spring Session" program takes place each February, allowing students to engage in numerous on and off campus activities. These range from painting, to bioethics, to trips abroad.

The Chaminade-Madonna Theatre Company currently produces two productions each year, down from the four produced in years past.

The Chaminade-Madonna Athletics Department offers a weight training "Perfect Competition" program for their football players.

Notable alumni
Sports

 Kamar Aiken '07 - NFL: Baltimore Ravens, wide receiver
 Jon Beason '03 - University of Miami football team, linebacker; NFL: New York Giants, linebacker
 Marquise "Hollywood" Brown '16 - Baltimore Ravens wide receiver
 Bill Capece '77 - NFL: Tampa Bay Buccaneers place kicker 
 Joe Klink - Major League Baseball pitcher
 Billy Mitchell '83 - professional video game player and hot sauce company owner
 Chris Nuñez - tattoo artist on TLC reality show Miami Ink
 David Shula '77 - NFL: Coach
 Cary Williams '03 - NFL: Seattle Seahawks, cornerback

Theater
 Bobby Pearce '79 - Broadway costume designer

Music
 Cyrus Bolooki '98 - drummer for New Found Glory

Broadcasting and journalism
 Dan Le Batard - Miami Herald columnist
 Chris Myers '76 - Fox sportscaster-commentator

Politics
 Sheila Cherfilus-McCormick - Member of the U.S. House of Representatives from Florida's 20th district
 AJ Ryan IV - Mayor of Dania Beach, Florida

See also 
 William Joseph Chaminade
 Marianists

Notes and references

External links 
 Official school website

Educational institutions established in 1960
Catholic secondary schools in Florida
Marianist schools
Roman Catholic Archdiocese of Miami
Private high schools in Broward County, Florida
Schools accredited by the Southern Association of Colleges and Schools
Buildings and structures in Hollywood, Florida
1960 establishments in Florida